Marcel Desailly Pro Soccer is a soccer video game developed and published by Gameloft for mobile phones and Nokia N-Gage. The title is based on French football player Marcel Desailly.

Reception 

The N-Gage version received "generally unfavorable reviews" according to the review aggregation website Metacritic.

References

External links
 

2003 video games
Association football video games
Mobile games
N-Gage games
Palm OS games
Cultural depictions of French men
Cultural depictions of association football players
Video games based on real people
Video games developed in France
Gameloft games
Multiplayer and single-player video games